Laakhon Mein Ek is an Indian streaming television series created by Atharv Agrawal Rath, produced by OML Production. It is an Amazon Prime Video original series. Season 1 premiered on October 13, 2017, premise of the series revolved around the struggles of Aakash, a teenage student from Raipur who is sent to a coaching centre Genius Infinity in Visakhapatnam for preparation of IIT entrance exam. The Season 2 premiered on April 12, 2019, and was about Dr. Shreya and her fight with government for healthcare in Sitlapur Village.

Premise

Season 1
Aakash Gupta wants to make mimicry videos and become an internet sensation, but his father wants him to be an IITian and an engineer. He doesn't get admission in any college in Raipur after getting 55 percent marks in board exams. His father sends him to a coaching institute Genius Infinity in Visakhapatnam where he gets sent to section D, where the students with least marks in 10th Boards are enrolled. He befriends his roommates Chudail and Bakri.

Season 2
Dr Shreya is posted in Sitlapur village to conduct a cataract camp. But the villagers aren't the biggest believers in Government healthcare, the supplies aren't separate from the politics, and the staff isn't the dream team one would desire.

Cast

Season 1
Ritvik Sahore as Aakash
Alam Khan as Chudail
Jay Thakkar as Bakri
Shiv Kumar Subramaniam as Mr Moorthy
Ajita Kulkarni as Mrs Gupta
Biswa Kalyan Rath as Professor Trpathi
Mayank Parakh as Bala Aasuri

Season 2
Shweta Tripathi as Dr. Shreya Pathare
Sandeep Mehta as Dr. Gopal Patwardhan(CMO)
Rupesh Tillu as Bhola
Suyash Joshi as Raju Babu
Arun Nalawade as Ishwar Mhatre
Milind Joshi as Health Minister
Ishan Mishra as Dr. Ankit Gupta
Pravina Deshpande as Dr. Madhavi
Prithvik Pratap as Ravi Aathlye

Production

Created by Biswa Kalyan Rath, the show is produced by OML Production, directed by Abhishek Sengupta and written by Vaspar Dandiwala, Biswa Kalyan Rath and Karan Agarwal. Biswa began writing Laakhon Mein Ek somewhere between late 2015 and early 2016. Biswa said he started writing the story simultaneously with doing comedy and although from conception to the idea it took two years, the actual writing time is 8–12 months as he was "doing several other things alongside". The script first started as Biswa's own story but later on it developed to its own story, inspired by "people he met and places he has been to". When asked about the casting process, Biswa credits his director, saying that he "wanted to keep it realistic by not making a 22-year-old play an 18-year-old". Sengupta said that "[w]e really lucked out with the boys — Aakash, Bakri, and Chudail (the three protagonists)" and "we wanted to have people who could relate to the characters. 
Aakash Agarwal handled the cinematography and the production designer was Prashant Bidkar. Ruby Thakur served as the Executive Producer. Shruti Rao and Tihany Sengupta served as the supervising producers".

Biswa started writing Season Two almost immediately after the release of Season One. Collaborating with director Abhishek Sengupta and writer Hussian Haidry, they had innumerable conversations with several medical professionals and public health practitioners to write this story.
Aakash Agarwal handled the cinematography and the production designer was Snehi Shah. Varsha Venkatesan served as the Executive Producer for the Second Season along with Tihany Sengupta as the supervising producer.

Episodes

Season 1

Season 2

Critical reception
Laakhon Mein Ek received mixed critical feedback. Rahul Desai of the Film Companion gave three stars out of five to the show, and wrote that "it's the mechanics of this atmosphere – the specifics and little details – that makes this show more lived-in than its mainstream companions". Mid Day's Letty Mariam Abraham wrote that "Laakhon Mein Ek is a powerful drama" and gave it two and a half stars out of five. The Quint's Megha Mathur wrote that "[it] [f]eels like Biswa got a little lazy while writing the end" and "Laakhon Mein Ek is no unique take on Indian parenting and education, but I wish Biswa’s edgy humour had translated into a more satirical and dark drama that stood out in the crowd". Akhil Sood of The Hindu wrote that "Laakhon Mein Ek is not without its flaws — for starters, basing its very premise on an overdone subject — but it succeeds in its raw depiction of a life that leaves lakhs of embittered students in its wake". FirstPost'''s Utkarsh Srivastava praised the show's music and background score as "top notch" but criticised the show's writing saying that "[s]adly, Laakhon Mein Ek disappoints on the very front it was expected to do well: the writing", and "Biswa cannot translate his comedy gifts into a solid drama storyline". Sampada Sharma of The Indian Express also praised the sound design and said that it is "honestly quite refreshing" to watch the show. Kritika Dua of the Daily Pioneer gave four stars out of five to the show. Aditya Mani Jha of the DailyO praised the show's writing, cinematography and actors' acting and wrote that "Laakhon Mein Ek'' is a success, smartly written, competently shot with a no-frills aesthetic, and brilliantly acted".

References 

Amazon Prime Video original programming
2017 Indian television series debuts
Hindi-language television shows
Indian teen drama television series
Television shows set in Andhra Pradesh
Indian Institutes of Technology in fiction
2019 Indian television seasons
Indian medical television series
Television shows set in Uttar Pradesh
Television series set in the 2010s